"An Encounter" is a short story by James Joyce. It is second in a collection of Joyce's short stories called Dubliners. In the story, two young boys experience an eerie encounter with a strange, old man. It deals with themes such as routine and wanderlust.

The story
The story involves a boy – the narrator – and his friend Mahony taking a day off from school and going to the shore, to seek adventure in their otherwise-dull lives. As the narrator says, "The mimic warfare of the evening became at last as wearisome to me as the routine of school in the morning because I wanted real adventures to happen to myself. But real adventures, I reflected, do not happen to people who remain at home: they must be sought abroad."

The episode revolves around their trip and the people that they see. There are enormous social events that the boys witness and the narrator, in an act of maturity, seems to at least be able to notice the situations. For example, the boys are mistaken for Protestants by some local children.  The narrator also notices that many of the children are "ragged" and extremely poor.

Near the end of their day, the boys are approached by an older man who gives them an odd feeling. Previously, it seems to the reader that the man had been 'sizing them up' and then began to talk of mundane subjects, such as Sir Walter Scott and young sweethearts. At one point, the man excuses himself and it is implied that he masturbates before returning to the boys. He then begins a drawn-out monologue on the subject of whipping and other such corporal punishments. Deeply unsettled, the narrator looks to his friend Mahony for comfort, although he admits to harboring negative feelings about his friend.

Online texts
An Encounter – From the book Dubliners.

External links
 

Short stories by James Joyce
1914 short stories